Burning the Hard City is the fifth studio album by Djam Karet, released in 1991 by HC Productions.

Track listing

Personnel
Adapted from Burning the Hard City liner notes.

Djam Karet
Gayle Ellett – electric guitar, seven-string guitar, guitar synthesizer, keyboards, tape, percussion
Mike Henderson – electric guitar, acoustic guitar, twelve-string guitar, acoustic twelve-string guitar, keyboards, percussion
Chuck Oken – drums, electronic drums, synthesizer, engineering
Henry J. Osborne – five-string bass guitar, keyboards, percussion

Production and additional personnel
Rob Dechaine – engineering, mixing, production
Djam Karet – production
Dave Druse – illustrations, design

Release history

References

External links 
 
 Burning the Hard City at Bandcamp

1991 albums
Cuneiform Records albums
Djam Karet albums